Daniel Dewey (January 29, 1766 – May 26, 1815) was a U.S. Representative from Sheffield, Massachusetts.

Career 
Born in Sheffield in the Province of Massachusetts Bay, Dewey attended Yale College. He studied law. He was admitted to the bar in 1787 and commenced practice in Williamstown, Massachusetts.
He was treasurer of Williams College, Williamstown, Massachusetts from 1798 to 1814. He served as member of the Massachusetts Governor's Council 1809–1812.

Dewey was elected as a Federalist to the Thirteenth Congress and served from March 4, 1813, until February 24, 1814, when he resigned, having been assigned to a judicial position. He was appointed by Governor Caleb Strong an associate judge of the Massachusetts Supreme Judicial Court on February 24, 1814, and served until his death in Williamstown, Massachusetts, May 26, 1815.
He was interred in West Lawn Cemetery.

References

1766 births
1815 deaths
People from Sheffield, Massachusetts
Williams College alumni
Yale College alumni
Federalist Party members of the United States House of Representatives from Massachusetts